Capivari de Baixo is a Brazilian municipality located in the southern region of Santa Catarina. In 2010, it had a population estimated at 21,674 inhabitants. As of 2020, the population was estimated to be at 25,177. From 1991 to 2000, the demographic growth has been of 1,51% yearly, while the national average was of 1,63%. From 2000 to 2010, the demographic growth was of 1,56% yearly, while the national average was of 1,17%. Capivari de Baixo has the largest coal-fired thermoelectric power plant of Latin America, Complexo Termoelétrico Jorge Lacerda.

References

Municipalities in Santa Catarina (state)